Oreometra is a genus of moths in the family Geometridae.

Species
Some species in this genus are:
Oreometra fifae Wiltshire, 1986
Oreometra ras Herbulot, 1983
Oreometra vittata Aurivillius, 1910

References

Ennominae